"I Want to Walk You Home" is a July 1959 R&B/pop single by Fats Domino. The single would be the last of Domino's releases to hit number one on the R&B chart. "I Want to Walk You Home" stayed at the top spot for a single week and also peaked at number eight on the Billboard Hot 100.

Cover versions
In 2007, the song was covered by Paul McCartney who sung it, and Allen Toussaint playing the piano, as their contribution to Goin' Home: A Tribute to Fats Domino (Vanguard).

References

1959 singles
Fats Domino songs
1959 songs
Songs written by Fats Domino
Imperial Records singles